This Is Janis Joplin 1965 is an album by Janis Joplin released by James Gurley in 1995.

Record history
Recorded originally in 1965, the seven tracks that appear here are all previously unreleased, including Joplin's original version of her song "Turtle Blues" and an alternate version of "Cod'ine" by Buffy Sainte-Marie. Originally just Joplin and her guitar, a full band has been added to these tracks. The original takes of these songs have been released on the 9 disc compilation Blow All My Blues Away , with the exception of "Cod'ine", which is also the enhanced version featured on this collection.

Track listing
"Apple of My Eye"
"Zip Train [219 Train]"
"Cod'ine" (Buffy Sainte-Marie, Janis Joplin)
"Down and Out"
"Turtle Blues" (Janis Joplin)
"I Ain't Got a Worry"
"Brownsville"

1995 compilation albums
Janis Joplin compilation albums
Compilation albums published posthumously